Refugee is a young adult literature novel by Alan Gratz published by Scholastic Corporation in 2017.

The book revolves around three main characters from three different eras: Nazi Germany, 1990s Cuba, and modern-day Syria. It follows Josef Landau, a German Jew in the 1930s, who tries to escape Germany to Cuba, Isabel Fernandez, a Cuban girl in 1994, who tries to escape Cuba's hunger crisis following the dissolution of the Soviet Union to the US, and Mahmoud Bishara, a Syrian youth in 2015 whose house gets destroyed by a missile and whose family decides to seek asylum in Germany. It has received positive reviews that praised its style and historical accuracy. It also made it to the NYTimes Best Seller list. Similar novels written by Alan Gratz also include Prisoner B-3087 and Allies.

Characters

Josef Landau 
Josef Landau, is 12 years old at the beginning of the book, living in Nazi Germany in 1938. Josef's story begins when Josef's father Aaron gets taken away on Kristallnacht and is sent to the Dachau concentration camp by Nazi Stormtroopers. When his father is released six months later, Josef, his mother Rachel, his sister Ruthie, and his father, now traumatized by his experiences at Dachau, all board the MS St. Louis, which is set to take them to Cuba. A week into their stay in St. Louis, Josef has his bar mitzvah. In becoming an adult, he has many responsibilities that he is forced to take. With his father’s mental health deteriorating quicker, Josef threatens him to ensure that he can pass the medical inspection to get into Cuba, reversing their roles as father and son. While the passengers wait to be allowed to disembark, Josef encounters Isabel's grandfather, Mariano Padron, who is a Cuban government officer bound by duty not to let the Jewish refugees in, despite feeling sorry for them. Josef’s maturation continues as the situation worsens: after his father attempts suicide is separated from the family, his mother is stricken with grief, so Josef makes sure that Ruthie is being cared for and protected. When the Jewish refugees are rejected from entering Cuba and it seems likely that the ship is going to take them back to Germany, Josef works with other passengers to try to take the ship hostage so that they can avoid this fate. They fail, but they are not sent back to Germany. Instead, they are sent to France, where they stay. However, when Germany starts occupying France at the end of the novel, the Nazis give his mother the choice of setting only one of her children free. Josef sacrifices himself in order to relieve his mother from the burden of this choice and to save his little sister Ruthie from the concentration camps. Josef later dies in the camps, along with his mother. It is later learned that Josef's father is alive and well in Cuba.

Isabel Fernandez 
Isabel Fernandez is 11 years old in 1994, growing up in Havana, Cuba, under Fidel Castro’s communist regime. Isabel is deeply tied to her Cuban heritage, particularly through her music. One issue she experiences, however, is that she is unable to count a Cuban rhythm called  clave, which she thinks is supposed to come naturally to Cubans. When her father, Geraldo, is worried that the police are coming after him for protesting, Isabel rallies her own family and another family, the Castillos, to take a boat to Miami and escape the oppression of Cuba. She trades her trumpet for gasoline in order to get the boat to start. Among the people who join Isabel on the journey is her grandfather Lito, who is eventually revealed to be Mariano Padron, the Cuban officer who, decades ago, prevented Josef from entering Havana. Isabel spends much of the dangerous trip acting as an adult: she takes care of her eight-and-a-half-months pregnant mother, Teresa; she saves Señor Castillo when he is thrown overboard by waves; and she spends much of the trip relentlessly bailing out water from their boat so that they can continue their journey. Isabel also deals with a fair share of trauma that expedites this maturity: two years prior, her grandmother Lita drowned during a cyclone in Havana, and on this boat trip Isabel’s best friend, Iván, is killed in the water by sharks. Despite her grief, Isabel is able to persevere and guide her family to reach the shores of Miami. At the end of the book, Isabel is able to reconnect with her heritage when her great uncle Guillermo gives her a new trumpet, and Isabel is able to count clave.

Mahmoud Bishara 

Mahmoud Bishara is 12 years old in 2015, and lives in Aleppo, Syria with his father Youssef, his mother Fatima, his 10-year-old brother Waleed, and his infant sister Hana. Mahmoud has already had much experience dealing with the trauma of war, as the Syrian Civil War has already been raging for four years at the beginning of Mahmoud’s story. Mahmoud learns to cope with these conditions by assuming a protective role over Waleed, and by learning to be “invisible,” keeping his head down and ensuring nobody notices him to survive. Mahmoud grapples with this question of whether it is better to be invisible or visible over the course of the novel as his family travels from Syria to Germany. He understands that being unnoticed helps him avoid trouble, but he also begins to see the problems with remaining invisible, because it prevents good people from taking notice of them and providing aid. Mahmoud finally sees the power of visibility when he decides to walk out of the Hungarian detention center and lead the other refugees on a 12-hour march to Austria. This gains a large amount of media attention, and Austrians greet them at the border with food, water, and medicine. Thus, Mahmoud recognizes the importance of being visible, and his story also raises visibility for the many Syrian refugees who continue to need aid in the present. Like Josef, Mahmoud is also forced to make a difficult choice that shows his maturity and the weight of his responsibility. As Mahmoud and his family travel from Syria to Germany, they become stranded in the Mediterranean sea when their boat capsizes in the water. When another dinghy passes by that doesn’t have space for his family, he offers up Hana to them in order to ensure that she can survive. This is a decision that no 13-year-old should have to make, but Mahmoud’s difficult journey requires him to take on this burden. Eventually, Mahmoud and his family make it safely to Germany and are taken in by a host family, the elderly Saul Rosenberg and his wife, Ruthie—Josef’s little sister, who survived the Holocaust decades prior thanks to Josef’s self-sacrifice. However, Hana is lost and nowhere to be found, presumably lost or dead.

References

2017 American novels
American young adult novels
Novels about terrorism
Novels about the Holocaust
Novels about death
Scholastic Corporation books